Jaylen Waddle (born November 25, 1998) is an American football wide receiver for the Miami Dolphins of the National Football League (NFL). He played college football at Alabama and was drafted sixth overall by the Dolphins in the 2021 NFL Draft.

High school career
Waddle attended Episcopal High School in Bellaire, Texas. As a senior, he played in the U.S. Army All-American Game. He committed to the University of Alabama to play college football. He made the selection on National Signing Day of 2018 and chose the Crimson Tide over Texas, Texas A&M, Florida State, TCU, and Oregon.

College career

2018
As a true freshman at Alabama in 2018, Waddle was named the SEC Freshman of the Year after recording 45 receptions for 848 yards and seven touchdowns. As a punt returner, he also returned 16 punts for 233 yards and a touchdown.

2019
Waddle returned to the Crimson Tide for his sophomore season in 2019. He recorded 33 receptions for 560 yards and scored six receiving touchdowns. He also returned a punt 77 yards for a touchdown against LSU and a kickoff 98 yards for a touchdown against Auburn. He was named first-team All-SEC as a return specialist and was named SEC Special Teams Player of the Year.

2020
On October 24, 2020, Waddle broke his right ankle when he was tackled while returning the opening kickoff in a game against Tennessee. Waddle returned for the National Championship game against Ohio State. On January 14, 2021, Waddle announced that he would forgo his senior season and enter the 2021 NFL Draft.

Statistics

Professional career

Waddle was drafted sixth overall in the 2021 NFL Draft by the Miami Dolphins, reuniting him with his college quarterback Tua Tagovailoa. On May 14, 2021, Waddle signed with the Dolphins on a $27.1 million deal.

2021

In his first NFL game on September 12, 2021, Waddle faced off against former Alabama teammate QB Mac Jones and the New England Patriots. Waddle caught 4 of his 6 targets for 61 receiving yards, and also caught his first NFL receiving touchdown on a 3-yard pass from Tua Tagovailoa in the 17–16 win against the New England Patriots. His first big breakthrough came in Week 12 against the Carolina Panthers, finishing with 137 receiving yards as the Dolphins won 33–10. Throughout the season, Waddle became known for his waddling celebrations after touchdowns, inspired by his last name.

In his 16th game of the season, Waddle set the NFL rookie record for receptions in a season with 104, beating Anquan Boldin's old record of 101. Waddle finished his rookie season with 104 receptions for 1,015 yards and 7 total touchdowns.

2022
In a week 2 game against the Baltimore Ravens, Waddle had a career high of 11 receptions, 171 yards, and 2 touchdowns including the game winner to help the Dolphins comeback from a 35-14 4th quarter deficit. Eventually winning the game 42-38.

In a week 16 game against the Green Bay Packers, he had an 84-yard receiving touchdown, setting the record for longest play during an NFL Christmas game.

Waddle finished the season with 75 receptions, 1,356 receiving yards, 8 receiving touchdowns. The latter two figures set career highs. He also finished the season with 18.1 yards per catch which led the league.

NFL career statistics

Regular season

Postseason

References

External links
Alabama Crimson Tide bio
 Miami Dolphins bio

Living people
1998 births
21st-century African-American sportspeople
African-American players of American football
Alabama Crimson Tide football players
All-American college football players
American football wide receivers
Miami Dolphins players
Players of American football from Houston